Omar García is the name of:

Omar García (footballer, born 1939), Argentine footballer
Omar García (footballer, born 1983), Spanish footballer